The Minister for Disability Services is a minister of the Government of New South Wales with responsibility for social policy and welfare, including matters relating disability in the state of New South Wales, Australia.

The Minister since 21 December 2021 is Natasha Maclaren-Jones who also holds the Families and Communities portfolio.

Collectively the ministers administer the portfolio through the Stronger Communities cluster, in particular through the Department of Communities and Justice and a range of other government agencies.

List of ministers

See also 

List of New South Wales government agencies

Notes

References

Disability Services